This is a list of the Hitkrant Europarade number-one singles of 1960.

1960 record charts
Lists of number-one songs in Europe